The 1947 anti-Jewish riots in Aleppo were an attack on Syrian Jews in Aleppo, Syria in December 1947, following the United Nations vote in favour of partitioning Palestine. The attack, a part of an anti-Jewish wave of unrest across the Middle East and North Africa, resulted in some 75 Jews murdered and several hundred wounded. In the aftermath of the riots, half the city's Jewish population fled the city.

History

Syria gained independence from France in April 1946. The Haganah's illegal immigration operative Akiva Feinstein wrote in 1947 that the new Syrian government then commenced persecuting the Jewish minority, that all Jewish clerks working for the French bureaucracy were fired, and the government tried to stifle Jewish businesses. At the time of the United Nations vote on November 29, 1947, the Jewish community in Aleppo numbered around 10,000 and went back around two thousand years.

After the vote in favour of the partition of Palestine, the government abetted and organised Aleppo's Arab inhabitants to attack the city's Jewish population. The exact number of those killed remains unknown, but estimates are put at around 75, with several hundred wounded. Ten synagogues, five schools, an orphanage and a youth club, along with several Jewish shops and 150 houses were set ablaze and destroyed. Damaged property was estimated to be valued at US$2.5m. During the pogrom the Aleppo Codex, an important medieval manuscript of the Torah, was lost and feared destroyed. The book reappeared (with most pages missing) in Israel in 1958.

Following the attack, the Jewish community went into a steep decline. Wealthy Jews escaped the day after the pogrom and many more fled in small groups in subsequent months. Their property was forfeited and on December 22 the Syrian Government enacted a law forbidding Jews from selling their property. As of 2012, no Jews live in Aleppo.

See also
1945 Tripoli pogrom
Farhud
Jewish exodus from Arab and Muslim countries
Menarsha synagogue attack
Killings and massacres during the 1948 Palestine war

References 

Anti-Jewish pogroms by Muslims
Anti-Jewish pogroms by Muslims 1941-49
Ethnic riots
Mass murder in 1947
1947 in Syria
Antisemitism in Syria
Jewish Syrian history
Jews and Judaism in Aleppo
History of Aleppo

1947–1948 civil war in Mandatory Palestine
December 1947 events in Asia
1947 riots
1947 in Judaism
Massacres in 1947